Hugo High School is a public high school located in Hugo, Oklahoma. It serves grades 9–12 and has an enrollment of 315 students.

References

External links
Hugo High School

Public high schools in Oklahoma
Schools in Choctaw County, Oklahoma